The 2004 Tunbridge Wells Borough Council election took place on 10 June 2004 to elect members of Tunbridge Wells Borough Council in Kent, England. One third of the council was up for election and the Conservative Party stayed in overall control of the council.

After the election, the composition of the council was:
Conservative 35
Liberal Democrat 12
Labour 1

Election result

Ward results

References

2004 English local elections
2004
2000s in Kent